Athletic Bilbao is a professional association football club based in Bilbao, Spain, which plays in La Liga. This chronological list comprises all those who have held the position of manager of the first team of Athletic Bilbao from 1910, when the first professional manager was appointed, to the present day. Each manager's entry includes his dates of tenure, honours won and significant achievements while under his care.

List of managers

Trophies

References

External links
Coaches at Athletic Bilbao official website 

 
Lists of association football managers by club in Spain
Managers
Athletic Bilbao-related lists